The Razkari Party or Riz Kari (English: Liberation Party) is a Kurdish political group based in Lebanon that was established in 1975 by Faissal Fakhro.

Riz Kari supported the Kurdish forces fighting against the Iraqi regime. For a brief period during the 1975-76 Civil War, however, Riz Kari joined forces with the Kurdish Democratic Party – Lebanon (KDP-L) to form the Progressive Kurdish Front in an effort to eliminate differences in the ranks of Lebanese Kurds.

Riz Kari was weakened in the mid-1970s by the defection of part of its organization, which called itself the Leftist Riz Kari, or Riz Kari II.

This organization is led by Mahmoud Khodr Fattah Ahmad, a staunch ally of Syria. They rejected the formation of the Progressive Kurdish Front because it included the "right-wing" leadership of Jamil Meho. The party is allied with Hizbullah.

See also
Front of Patriotic and National Parties
Kurdish Democratic Party (Lebanon)
Lebanese Civil War
Lebanese National Movement

References

Factions in the Lebanese Civil War
Kurdish nationalist political parties
Political parties established in 1975
Political parties in Lebanon

Political parties of minorities in Lebanon